The UAE Tour is a road cycling stage race in the United Arab Emirates. It was first held in 2019 as part of the UCI World Tour. It was created as a result of the merging of the Abu Dhabi Tour and the Dubai Tour.

History
The first edition of the UAE Tour took place between 24 February and 2 March 2019 as part of the 2019 UCI World Tour.

Winners

See also
 Dubai Tour
 Abu Dhabi Tour

References

External links
 Official website

 
UCI World Tour races
Cycle races in the United Arab Emirates
Recurring sporting events established in 2019
2019 establishments in the United Arab Emirates